The 2023 Adelaide International 2 was a tennis tournament on the 2023 ATP Tour and 2023 WTA Tour. It was a combined ATP Tour 250 and WTA 500 tournament played on outdoor hard courts in Adelaide, South Australia, Australia.

Due to the tournament's interim replacement of Sydney International in Sydney, New South Wales, which hosted the inaugural 2023 United Cup. This was the fourth edition of the tournament for the women and the third edition for the men. The tournament took place at the Memorial Drive Tennis Centre from 9–14 January 2023 and it followed from a week before the 2023 Adelaide International 1, a combined ATP Tour 250 and WTA 500 tournament, at the same venue.

Champions

Men's singles 

  Kwon Soon-woo def.  Roberto Bautista Agut, 6–4, 3–6, 7–6(7–4)
 It was Soon-woo's 1st title of the year and the 2nd of his career.

Men's doubles 

  Marcelo Arévalo /  Jean-Julien Rojer def.  Ivan Dodig /  Austin Krajicek, Walkover

Women's singles 

  Belinda Bencic def.  Daria Kasatkina 6–0, 6–2

Women's doubles 

  Luisa Stefani /  Taylor Townsend def.  Anastasia Pavlyuchenkova /  Elena Rybakina 7–5, 7–6(7–3)

Points & Prize money

Points distribution 

*per team

Prize money 

*per team

ATP singles main draw entrants

Seeds 

† Rankings are as of 2 January 2023

Other entrants 
The following players received wildcard entry into the singles main draw:
  Thanasi Kokkinakis
  Jason Kubler
  Alexei Popyrin

The following player received entry using a protected ranking into the singles main draw:
  Kyle Edmund

The following players received entry from the qualifying draw:
  Tomás Martín Etcheverry
  Tomáš Macháč
  John Millman
  Mikael Ymer

The following players received entry as lucky losers:
  Robin Haase
  Kwon Soon-woo
  Christopher O'Connell

Withdrawals 
  Maxime Cressy → replaced by  Robin Haase
  Sebastian Korda → replaced by  Christopher O'Connell
  Nick Kyrgios → replaced by  Kyle Edmund
  Lorenzo Musetti → replaced by  Mackenzie McDonald
  Yoshihito Nishioka → replaced by  Kwon Soon-woo

ATP doubles main draw entrants

Seeds

† Rankings are as of 2 January 2023

Other entrants
The following pairs received wildcards into the doubles main draw:
  Jeremy Beale /  Luke Saville 
  Blake Ellis /  Andrew Harris

The following pair received entry as alternates:
  Tomás Martín Etcheverry /  Diego Hidalgo

Withdrawals
  Maxime Cressy /  Albano Olivetti → replaced by  Tomás Martín Etcheverry /  Diego Hidalgo

WTA singles main draw entrants

Seeds 

† Rankings are as of 2 January 2023

Other entrants 
The following players received wildcard entry into the singles main draw:
  Victoria Azarenka
  Jaimee Fourlis
  Storm Hunter
  Garbiñe Muguruza

The following player received entry using a protected ranking into the singles main draw:
  Anastasia Pavlyuchenkova

The following player received entry using a special exempt:
  Irina-Camelia Begu

The following players received entry from the qualifying draw:
  Sorana Cîrstea
  Anna Kalinskaya
  Karolína Plíšková
  Kateřina Siniaková
  Jil Teichmann
  Zheng Qinwen

The following players received entry as lucky losers:
  Amanda Anisimova
  Kaia Kanepi
  Anastasia Potapova
  Alison Riske-Amritraj
  Shelby Rogers

Withdrawals 
  Irina-Camelia Begu → replaced by  Kaia Kanepi
  Ons Jabeur → replaced by  Shelby Rogers
  Madison Keys → replaced by  Alison Riske-Amritraj
  Jessica Pegula → replaced by  Amanda Anisimova
  Iga Świątek → replaced by  Anastasia Potapova

WTA doubles main draw entrants

Seeds 

1 Rankings as of 2 January 2023.

Other entrants 
The following pair received a wildcard into the doubles main draw:
  Alana Parnaby /  Olivia Tjandramulia

Withdrawals 
  Coco Gauff /  Jessica Pegula 
  Caty McNally /  Luisa Stefani → replaced by  Luisa Stefani /  Taylor Townsend

References

External links 
 

2023
2023 ATP Tour
2023 WTA Tour
Adel
January 2023 sports events in Australia